Keith Sullivan is an Australian former professional darts player.

Career
Sullivan played in three BDO World Darts Championships. In 1991, he defeated future world champion Raymond van Barneveld in the first round, but lost to Alan Warriner in round two. In 1992 he defeated Peter Evison 3–1 in the first round but was defeated by Rod Harrington 3–2 in the second round. In 1993, he lost in the first round to Bobby George. He also played in the Winmau World Masters twice, in 1991 where he lost in the first round to Dave Kelly, and in 1992 where he beat Peter Locke to progress into the second round where he was beaten by Kevin Spiolek. He won the 1991 Australian Grand Masters and reached the semi final of the 1991 British Open.

World Championship results

BDO
 1991 Last 16: (lost to Alan Warriner-Little 1–3)
 1992 Last 16: (lost to Rod Harrington 2–3)
 1993 Last 32: (lost to Bobby George 1–3)

External links
Profile at Darts Database

Australian darts players
Living people
British Darts Organisation players
Year of birth missing (living people)